Gladwin High School is a public high school located at 1400 N Spring St in Gladwin, Michigan. It is the only high school in the Gladwin Community Schools district.

Demographics
The demographic breakdown of the 581 students enrolled in 20152016 was:
Male - 51.5%
Female - 48.5%
Native American/Alaskan - 0.5%
Asian/Pacific islanders - 0.9%
Black - 0.7%
Hispanic - 1.2%
White - 94.5%
Multiracial - 2.2%

43.7% of the students were eligible for free or reduced price lunch.

Athletics
The school's teams compete in the Jack Pine Conference for most of the school's sports. However, Gladwin's soccer teams compete in the Northern Michigan Soccer League. Additionally, Gladwin's hockey is played as the Mid-Michigan Storm, which is a cooperative program between Gladwin, Ogemaw Heights, Beaverton High, and Harrison High Schools.  The Storm plays their home games at the Gladwin Community Arena and is part of the Northern Michigan Hockey League. Gladwin offers the following MHSAA sanctioned sports:

Baseball (boys)
Basketball (girls and boys)
Girls state champion - 1975 
Bowling (girls and boys)
Boys state champion - 2019, 2022 
Cross country (girls and boys)
Football (boys)
State champion - 2022 
Golf (boys)
Ice hockey (boys)
Soccer (girls and boys)
Softball (girls)
Track and field (girls and boys)
Volleyball (girls)
Wrestling (boys)

References

External links

Public high schools in Michigan
Schools in Gladwin County, Michigan